Plagiolabra is a neotropical genus of potter wasps currently containing 2 species found in the Gran Chaco biogeographical province of central South America, in Argentina, Brazil and Paraguay.

References

Biological pest control wasps
Potter wasps